Salema may refer to:

People
 Anziza Salema, singer from Madagascar
 Joseph C. Salema, former Chief of Staff of New Jersey
 Salema Kasdaoui, Tunisian football player

Places

India
 Salema, India, a village in India
 Salema Bazar, a village in India

Portugal
 Salema, Portugal, a village and beach in Portugal

Fish
 Salema porgy, a species of sea bream

See also
 Salemas, an ancestor of Ezra in the Bible
 Cave of Salemas, a paleolithic cultural site in Portugal